Lagarde-Hachan is a commune in the Gers department in southwestern France.

Geography
The Petite Baïse forms part of the commune's western border.

Population

See also
Communes of the Gers department

References

Communes of Gers